The Vocation of Man is a work by Johann Gottlieb Fichte. The work was originally published by Fichte in 1799 and translated into English by Jane Sinnett in 1846 and by William Smith in 1848. Fichte identifies three distinct stages in the development of faith: 1. Doubt, 2. Knowledge, 3. Faith.

See also
 Butterfly effect

References

External links
Text in English
 The Destination of Man, Sinnett translation, 1846
 The Vocation of Man, Smith translation, 1848
 
Text in German
 Die Bestimmung des Menschen, 1800

1799 non-fiction books
Books by Johann Gottlieb Fichte
Modern philosophical literature